Kenneth Neil Atkinson (born June 2, 1967) is an American professional basketball coach and former player who serves as assistant coach for the Golden State Warriors of the National Basketball Association (NBA). He was previously the head coach of the Brooklyn Nets from 2016 to 2020. Atkinson was born in Huntington, New York and played college basketball for University of Richmond leading the Spiders to a Sweet Sixteen berth in the NCAA Division I men's basketball tournament in 1988.

Playing career
Atkinson averaged 18.9 points per game during his senior season at Richmond and played professionally in Italy, France, Germany, Spain, and the Netherlands from 1993 to 2004. He had tryouts with several NBA teams including the Knicks in summer of 1991. He was inducted into the Suffolk Sports Hall of Fame in 2020.

NBA coaching career
Atkinson joined the New York Knicks coaching staff as an assistant coach under Mike D'Antoni on August 6, 2008.

In 2012 after four seasons with the Knicks, he joined the Atlanta Hawks coaching staff under Mike Budenholzer. On April 17, 2016, it was announced that Atkinson become the head coach of the Brooklyn Nets after the Hawks' season ended.

Brooklyn Nets (2016–2020)
Atkinson made his NBA head coaching debut on October 26, 2016, in a 122–117 loss to the Boston Celtics. He got his first win as an NBA head coach two days later when the Nets defeated the Indiana Pacers 103–94. The Nets finished the season with a 20–62 record, with a 0–10 record in February 2017.

Brook Lopez left the team in Atkinson's second season; Lopez was traded to the Los Angeles Lakers in an off-season deal. The Nets were competitive for the early part of the season before going 1-9 in February, ending any chance to be in the playoffs. They finished the season with a 28–54 record, which was an eight-game improvement from the previous season.

In Atkinson's third season with the Nets he led the team to a 42–40 record, winning 14 games more than the previous season, and a playoff berth with the sixth seed. The Nets lost to the Philadelphia 76ers in five games in the first round of the playoffs.

Atkinson stepped down as head coach of the Nets on March 7, 2020.

Los Angeles Clippers (2020–2021)
On November 16, 2020, Atkinson was hired as an assistant coach for the Los Angeles Clippers under head coach Tyronn Lue.

Golden State Warriors (2021–present)
On August 13, 2021, the Golden State Warriors hired Atkinson as an assistant coach. He won his first NBA championship as the Warriors defeated the Boston Celtics in six games in the 2022 NBA Finals. During the NBA Finals the Charlotte Hornets offered Atkinson the position of head coach, but he reportedly turned it down after winning the championship.

Head coaching record

|-
| style="text-align:left;"|Brooklyn
| style="text-align:left;"|
| 82||20||62|||| style="text-align:center;"|5th in Atlantic||—||—||—||—
| style="text-align:center;"|Missed playoffs
|-
| style="text-align:left;"|Brooklyn
| style="text-align:left;"|
| 82||28||54|||| style="text-align:center;"|5th in Atlantic||—||—||—||—
| style="text-align:center;"|Missed playoffs
|-
| style="text-align:left;"|Brooklyn
| style="text-align:left;"|
| 82||42||40|||| style="text-align:center;"|4th in Atlantic||5||1||4||
| style="text-align:center;"|Lost in First Round
|-
| style="text-align:left;"|Brooklyn
| style="text-align:left;"|
| 62||28||34|||| style="text-align:center;"|(resigned)||—||—||—||—
| style="text-align:center;"|—
|- class="sortbottom"
| style="text-align:center;" colspan="2"|Career
| 308||118||190|||| ||5||1||4||||

References

External links
 NBA.com Profile
 Profile at Eurobasket.com

1967 births
Living people
People from Huntington, New York
People from Northport, New York
Amsterdam Basketball players
ALM Évreux Basket players
American expatriate basketball people in France
American expatriate basketball people in Germany
American expatriate basketball people in Italy
American expatriate basketball people in the Netherlands
American expatriate basketball people in Spain
American men's basketball coaches
American men's basketball players
Atlanta Hawks assistant coaches
Basketball coaches from New York (state)
Basketball players from New York (state)
Brooklyn Nets head coaches
Golden State Warriors assistant coaches
Dutch Basketball League players
FC Mulhouse Basket players
Liga ACB players
Montpellier Paillade Basket players
New York Knicks assistant coaches
Partenope Napoli Basket players
Point guards
Richmond Spiders men's basketball players
Sportspeople from Suffolk County, New York
Wichita Falls Texans players